Adesmus monnei is a species of beetle in the family Cerambycidae. It was described by Galileo and Martins in 2009. It is known from Brazil.

References

Adesmus
Beetles described in 2009